Robin Briggs,  (born 26 May 1942) is an English historian who has spent his entire academic career at All Souls College, Oxford.

Early life and education
Born in Braintree to Donald Frederick and Kathleen Ann Briggs, he went up to Balliol College, Oxford, in 1961 and graduated with a first-class modern history Bachelor of Arts degree in 1964.

Academic career
He was appointed a fellow of All Souls College, Oxford, that year, after passing its examination; he was then appointed a junior research fellow there in 1971 and then senior research fellow seven years later. Briggs remained in that post until retiring and being appointed an emeritus fellow at All Souls in 2009. From 1976 to 2009, he also lectured for the University of Oxford, and was junior proctor in the 1972–73 year.

His research interests include the history of witchcraft in Europe and other aspects of early modern European history (especially politics, society and religion, and the history of early modern France and the French Catholic Church).

Honours 
Briggs was elected a Fellow of the Royal Historical Society in 1969, a Fellow of the Royal Society of Literature in 2002 and a Fellow of the British Academy in 2009 (the latter being the United Kingdom's national academy for the humanities and social sciences).

Selected publications 
 The Witches of Lorraine (Oxford University Press, 2007).
 Witches and Neighbours: The Social and Cultural Context of European Witchcraft (Harper Collins, 1996).
 "The Académie Royale des Sciences and the pursuit of utility", Past and Present, vol. 131 (1991), pp. 38–88.
 Communities of Belief: Social and Cultural Tensions in Early Modern France (Oxford University Press, 1989).
 Early Modern France, 1560–1715 (Oxford University Press, 1977).

References 

Living people
1942 births
People from Braintree, Essex
English historians
Alumni of Balliol College, Oxford
Fellows of All Souls College, Oxford
Fellows of the Royal Historical Society
Fellows of the Royal Society of Literature
Fellows of the British Academy